Hahnodontidae is a family of extinct mammaliaforms from Early Cretaceous deposits in Morocco and the Western United States. Although originally considered to belong to the extinct clade Multituberculata, recent work indicates that hahnodontids belong to the more primitive clade Haramiyida.

Distribution
The genera Hahnodon and Denisodon occur in the Early Cretaceous of Morocco, while the genus Cifelliodon is found in the Barremian-age Yellow Cat Member of the Cedar Mountain Formation in Utah.

Phylogeny
Sigogneau-Russell (1991) and Hahn & Hahn (2003) classified hahnodontids as multituberculates, but the cladistic analysis of Cifelliodon recovered them outside Multituberculata as phylogenetically intermediate between Docodonta and crown Mammalia. The gondwanathere Vintana was also recovered as sister to members of Hahnodontidae.

References

 Sigogneau-Russell (1991), "First evidence of Multituberculata (Mammalia) in the Mesozoic of Africa". Neues Jahrb Geol Paläontol, Monatshefte, p. 119-125.
 Kielan-Jaworowska Z & Hurum JH (2001), "Phylogeny and Systematics of multituberculate mammals". Paleontology 44, p. 389-429.
 Much of this information has been derived from  MESOZOIC MAMMALS: Basal Multituberculata, an Internet directory.

Haramiyida
Prehistoric therapsid families
Taxa named by Denise Sigogneau‐Russell